Old Louisiana is a 1937 American Western film, directed by Irvin Willat. It stars Tom Keene, Rita Hayworth, and Will Morgan.

References

External links
Old Louisiana at the Internet Movie Database

1937 films
1930s historical films
American historical films
American Western (genre) films
1937 Western (genre) films
Films directed by Irvin Willat
Films set in the 1800s
Films set in Louisiana
American black-and-white films
1930s American films